Irakoze Erica, professionally known as Miss Erica, is a Burundian Singer-songwriter.

Early life
From Burundian and Rwandan parents Miss Erica grew up in Kigali. She embarked on a musical career after high school.

Career
She made her musical debut in 2011 as a member of the Kora Entertainment label in collaboration with Best Life Music. In 2016, Miss Erica formed a duo with Lacia and collaborated on a song with Burundian Superstar Sat-B titled Joto.

Many of her earlier songs were in the dancehall genre but Miss Erica surprised her following with highlife song Angalia in July 2017, featuring Kiwundo artists Vampino, Rabadaba, Diplomate and Milly. Other songs in her repertoire include Buziraherezo, Give me love and Mon Amour.

Discography

Singles 
"Nkundira" rmx ft Gaga Blue and Frank Duniano
"Ndatashe" Iwacu ft Sat-B
"Tell me"
"Give me love"
"Joto" ft Lacia x Sat-B
"Buziraherezo"
 "Angalia" – all Stars Kiwundo
"Impanvu" ft Sumi Crazy
"Mon Amour"
Sinovako
In My Heart ft Sat-B
My Hero

Awards and nominations

Buja Music Awards

|-
| rowspan="1"|2019
|Mon Amour
|Song Of The Year
|
|-
|-
| rowspan="1"|2019
|Mon Amour
|Best R&B/Afro Song
|
|-
|-
| rowspan="1"|2019
|Miss Erica
|Best Female Artist
|
|-
|-
| rowspan="1"|2019
|Mon Amour
|Video Of The Year
|
|-

Afrimusic Song Contest

|-
| rowspan="1"|2020
|Miss Erica / In My Heart
|Afrimusic Song Contest 2020 winner
|
|-
|-
| rowspan="1"|2020
|Miss Erica / In My Heart
|Eurovision Coverage Facebook Buzz Award
|
|-
|-
| rowspan="1"|2020
|Miss Erica / In My Heart
|Best French Lyric
|
|-

References 

Living people
Burundian women singers
Year of birth missing (living people)
People from Bujumbura